Ivaylo Ivanov (born 20 July 1994, Montana, Bulgaria) is a Bulgarian judoka who represented Bulgaria at the 2016 Summer Olympics in Rio de Janeiro, in the Men's -81 kg. In 2020, he won the silver medal in the men's 81 kg event at the 2020 European Judo Championships held in Prague, Czech Republic.

In 2021, he won one of the bronze medals in his event at the 2021 Judo World Masters held in Doha, Qatar.

References

External links
 
 
 
 

1994 births
Bulgarian male judoka
Judoka at the 2016 Summer Olympics
Living people
Olympic judoka of Bulgaria
Judoka at the 2015 European Games
Judoka at the 2019 European Games
European Games medalists in judo
European Games silver medalists for Bulgaria
Judoka at the 2020 Summer Olympics
21st-century Bulgarian people